The seventh Summit of the Americas was held at Panama City, Panama, on April 10 – 11, 2015.

Background
The Summits of the Americas are a continuing series of summits bringing together the leaders of the Americas including North America (which includes Central America and the Caribbean) and South America.  The function of these summits is to foster discussion of a variety of issues affecting the western hemisphere under the aegis of the Organization of American States. In the early 1990s, what were formerly ad hoc summits came to be institutionalised into a regular "Summits of the Americas" conference programme.

At the 6th Summit of the Americas numerous leaders across the political spectrum said that the next summit must include Cuba. The ALBA states also added that they would boycott a summit without Cuba's presence. A final declaration at the summit was also held up over the issue of Cuba.

Cuban presence at the summit
Cuba, along with the United States, attended the seventh Summit of the Americas in Panama. Given the pledge by ALBA member states to boycott the summit if Cuba was not invited, political controversy brewed as it transpired that Panama's government issued an invitation to the Summit. State Department spokesman Jen Psaki implicitly cautioned that Cuba's attendance of the summit would make a mockery of the spirit of the Inter-American Democratic Charter. For their part, Cuban-American senators Bob Menendez and Marco Rubio urged Panama to withdraw the invitation for Cuba to attend the summit, insisting that the move could be a slap in the face to the principles of the Inter-American Democratic Charter. However, another State Department official hinted that the US would tacitly welcome Cuba's participation in the 2015 Summit of the Americas. Following the announcement on December 17, 2014 of a shift towards normalization of relations with Cuba, the US Government dropped its objections to Cuba's presence while calling for the participation of Cuban civil society groups. Before the summit, the daughter of Oswaldo Payá, Rosa Maria Payá, was detained upon arriving at an airport in Panama; a second activist from Argentina also said they were detained.

The summit had an anti-American tone, according to the Associated Press.

Parallel events
While the Summit of the Americas occurred in Panama, other events were held; one was attended by former American President Bill Clinton, and another was held in Panama City at the Florida International University campus.

Another summit called the Summit of the Peoples (Cumbre de los Pueblos), which was held at University of Panama on April 9–11, 2015 with the participation of trade unions, organizations of farmers, indigenous people, students, human rights activists, environmentalists, and feminists among others. At some parts of this event there also attended President of Bolivia Evo Morales, President of Ecuador Rafael Correa and President of Venezuela Nicolás Maduro.

Heads of State and Government

References

Organization of American States
Politics of the Americas
21st-century diplomatic conferences (Americas)
2015 conferences
2015 in international relations
2015 in North America
2015 in South America
2015 in Panama
Diplomatic conferences in Panama
21st century in Panama City
April 2015 events in North America